Rachel Fox may refer to:
 Rachel G. Fox (born 1996), American actress
 Rachel Fox (softball) (born 1991), American softball player and coach
 Rachel Crosbee (née Fox, born 1969), British canoeist